, provisional designation , is a sub-kilometer asteroid, classified as a near-Earth object and potentially hazardous asteroid of the Apollo group, approximately  in diameter.

Description 

From discovery until August 2013 when Sentry updated to planetary ephemeris (DE431), it had the 4th highest impact threat on the Palermo Technical Impact Hazard Scale. It was discovered on 22 January 2013 by the Mount Lemmon Survey at an apparent magnitude of 21 using a  reflecting telescope. Six Precovery images from April 2003 have been located. It was removed from the Sentry Risk Table on 3 January 2014.

It has an observation arc of 10 years with an uncertainty parameter of 2. Perturbations by Earth, Venus, and Mercury will increase the orbital uncertainty over time. When the asteroid only had an observation arc of 52 days, virtual clones of the asteroid that fit the uncertainty region in the known trajectory showed a 1 in 588,000 chance that the asteroid could impact Earth on 11 December 2096. Using the nominal orbit, JPL Horizons shows that the asteroid will be  from Earth on 11 December 2096.  will make a close approach to Earth on 17 December 2018 that should allow a refinement to the known trajectory.

Numbering and naming 

This minor planet was numbered by the Minor Planet Center on 25 December 2015. As of 2018, it has not been named.

References

External links 
 List of the Potentially Hazardous Asteroids (PHAs), Minor Planet Center
 PHA Close Approaches To The Earth, Minor Planet Center
 List Of Apollo Minor Planets (by designation), Minor Planet Center
 Asteroid Lightcurve Database (LCDB), query form (info )
 
 
 

454101
454101
454101
Near-Earth objects removed from the Sentry Risk Table
20130122